Capel is a hamlet and civil parish in the borough of Tunbridge Wells in Kent, England. The parish is located on the north of the Weald,  to the east of Tonbridge. The southern part of the parish lies within the High Weald Area of Outstanding Natural Beauty, whilst most of the land also falls within the Metropolitan Green Belt. As well as Capel itself, the parish includes the communities of Castle Hill, Colts Hill, Five Oak Green, Postern, Tudeley and Whetsted.

History 
The name Capel may have derived from its church being a chapel of the nearby church at Tudeley.

The parish Church of St Thomas à Becket is now redundant, and in the care of the Churches Conservation Trust. Services are held there four times a year, and the church is open to visitors daily. It contains some lovely 12th century wall paintings depicting Cain and Abel, and Christ's entry to Jerusalem, originally there to help those who could not read learn the stories of the Bible. Outside is a yew tree under which Thomas Becket himself is supposed to have preached. The church tower was partly rebuilt following a fire in 1639.

The ecclesiastical parish is now known as Tudeley-cum-Capel with Five Oak Green.

Government 
Capel falls within the jurisdiction of Tunbridge Wells Borough Council. Capel ward is currently represented by a Liberal Democrat councillor, Hugh Patterson.

Geography 
There are two main clusters of buildings, one around the church, Church Farm and Tanners Farm, at the junction of Alders Road and Church lane; and another around the Dovecot Inn, on Alders Road.

Hasted described Capel in the late 18th-century as being in:

It has changed little since.

Culture and Community 
Capel also sports the Dovecote Inn, a fine traditional Kentish pub which received an award from CAMRA, The Campaign For Real Ale on 14 February 2009, marking the pub's inclusion in every edition of the Good Beer Guide for the previous 10 years.

References

External links
 Capel Parish Council Website
Capel parish church
CAMRA award
Tudeley-cum-Capel with Five Oak Green
Capel History Group website

Villages in Kent
Civil parishes in Kent